Albert E. Johnson (17 July 1918 – 5 August 1998) was an English professional rugby league footballer who played in the 1930s, 1940s and 1950s. He also appeared for St Helens and Wigan as a World War II guest player.

Playing career

International honours
Johnson won caps for England while at Warrington in 1944 against Wales, in 1945 against Wales (2 matches), in 1946 against France (2 matches), and Wales (2 matches), in 1947 against France (2 matches), and Wales, and won caps for Great Britain while at Warrington in 1946 against Australia (2 matches), and New Zealand, and in 1947 against New Zealand (3 matches).

Challenge Final appearances
Albert Johnson played , i.e. number 5, in Warrington's 19-0 victory over Widnes in the 1950–51 Challenge Cup Final during the 1949–50 season at Wembley Stadium, London on Saturday 6 May 1950, in front of a crowd of 94,249.

County Cup Final appearances
Albert Johnson played , i.e. number 5, and scored a try in Warrington's 8-14 defeat by Wigan in the 1948 Lancashire County Cup Final during the 1948–49 season at Station Road, Swinton on Saturday 13 November 1948, and played  in the 5-28 defeat by Wigan in the 1950 Lancashire County Cup Final during the 1950–51 season at Station Road, Swinton on Saturday 4 November 1950. He played 198 games for the club, and is a Warrington Wolves Hall of Fame inductee.

References

External links
Statistics at wigan.rlfans.com

1918 births
1998 deaths
England national rugby league team players
English rugby league players
Great Britain national rugby league team players
Place of birth missing
Place of death missing
Rugby league wingers
St Helens R.F.C. players
Warrington Wolves players
Wigan Warriors wartime guest players